The canton of Callac is an administrative division of the Côtes-d'Armor department, northwestern France. Its borders were modified at the French canton reorganisation which came into effect in March 2015. Its seat is in Callac.

It consists of the following communes:
 
Belle-Isle-en-Terre
Bourbriac
Bulat-Pestivien
Calanhel
Callac
Carnoët
La Chapelle-Neuve
Coadout
Duault
Gurunhuel
Kerien
Kerpert
Loc-Envel
Lohuec
Louargat
Maël-Pestivien
Magoar
Moustéru
Plésidy
Plougonver
Plourac'h
Plusquellec
Pont-Melvez
Saint-Adrien
Saint-Nicodème
Saint-Servais
Senven-Léhart
Tréglamus

References

Cantons of Côtes-d'Armor